During the morning of 19 January 2005, four car bombings occurred in Baghdad, Iraq. The attacks killed at least 26 people.

The first bomb detonated happened at around 7 am near the Australian embassy in Jadiriyah, central Baghdad and killed two Iraqis.

The second bomb exploded at around 7:30 am at a police station in Elwiya, eastern Baghdad. It killed 18 people, including five Iraqi Police officer and injured 36 other people.

The third bomb exploded near Baghdad International Airport, killing two Iraqi security guards.

The fourth bomb exploded at a military complex, killing two civilians and two Iraqi soldiers.

References

Baghdad bombings
bombings, 19 January 2005
Baghdad bombings
Baghdad bombings
21st-century mass murder in Iraq